The 1967 Men's World Team Squash Championships were held in Sydney, Australia and took place from August 09 to August 15, 1967.

Results

See also 
 World Team Squash Championships
 World Squash Federation
 World Open (squash)

References 

Sports competitions in Sydney
World Squash Championships
1967 in squash
1967 in Australian sport
Squash tournaments in Australia
International sports competitions hosted by Australia
August 1967 sports events in Australia